The New Taipei CTBC DEA are a Taiwanese professional basketball team based in New Taipei City, Taiwan. They have competed in the T1 League since the 2021-22 season, and play their home games at the Xinzhuang Gymnasium. The DEA became one of the six teams of the inaugural T1 League season.

Franchise history

2021: Team creation 
The CTBC DEA announced their establishment on 30 July 2021, name "DEA" was inspired from the Drug Enforcement Administration, one of United States federal law enforcement agencies. 

On 4 August 2021, the CTBC DEA acquired 1st round pick from Kaohsiung Aquas. Later in the 2021 draft, they drafted Shih Hsin small forward Mohammad Al Bachir Gadiaga and Chien Hsin Tech shooting guard Hsieh Ya-Hsuan. Al Bachir lives in Taiwan since he 8-years-old, he was also the second naturalization player of the Chinese Taipei men's national basketball team.

Home arenas 
 Xinzhuang Gymnasium (2021–present)

Current roster 

<noinclude>

Personnel

General managers

Head coaches

Season-by-season record

Notable players 
Local players
  Mohammad Al Bachir Gadiaga (阿巴西) – Chinese Taipei men's national basketball team player
  Hsieh Ya-Hsuan (謝亞軒) – Chinese Taipei men's national basketball team player
  Lee Hsueh-Lin (李學林) – Chinese Taipei men's national basketball team player, CBA Finals MVP (2012)
  Lin Ping-Sheng (林秉聖) – Chinese Taipei men's national basketball team player
  Lin Wei-Han (林韋翰) – Chinese Taipei men's national basketball team player
  Jonah Morrison (譚傑龍) – Chinese Taipei men's national basketball team player
  Tseng Wen-Ting (曾文鼎) – Chinese Taipei men's national basketball team player, SBL Finals MVP (2005, 2006), SBL MVP (2010)
  Wei Chia-Hao (魏嘉豪) – Chinese Taipei men's national basketball team player
Type-III players
  Chanatip Jakrawan – Thailand men's national basketball team player
  Avery Scharer – TBL Finals MVP (2018)
Import players
  Kaspars Bērziņš – Latvia men's national basketball team player
  Cleanthony Early – NBA player
  Prince Ibeh – Rwanda men's national basketball team player
  Edgaras Želionis – Lithuania men's national basketball team player

References

External links 
 
  
  
 

 
T1 League teams
2021 establishments in Taiwan
Basketball teams established in 2021
Sport in New Taipei